Gabrielle Réval (also G. Réval) is the pen name of Gabrielle Élise Victoire Logerot (20 December 1869 – 15 October 1938), a French novelist and essayist.

Biography

Gabrielle Réval was born as Gabrielle Élise Victoire Logerot on 20 December 1869, in Viterbo. She was a student at the École normale supérieure de jeunes filles (ENSJF) in Sèvres, receiving her teaching diploma in 1890. 

After  successfully passing the agrégation in 1893, she taught at the girls' high school in Niort.

Choosing the pen name "Réval", in several of her novels, she wrote about girls in their schools and their place in society, for example, Lycéennes (1902) and La Bachelière (1910). She was noticed from her first book, Les Sévriennes (1900), in which she describes her experiences in Sèvres. 

In 1904, when the issue of girls' primary and secondary education was gaining attention, she published L’Avenir de nos filles, a work listing women's professions. She underscored the precariousness for women to become authors: "Only a rich woman can, to some extent, reconcile her duties as a mother with those as a writer". 

In November that year, she co-founded "le prix Vie heureuse" (Happy Life award), which later became the Prix Femina. With 21 other women who contributed to the journal La Vie heureuse, she sought to develop an alternative to the Prix Goncourt, considered misogynistic.

From its inception until her death, she was an active member of the "Club des Belles Perdrix", the first French women writers' gastronomic club, which she co-founded at the restaurant Chez les Vikings, on 18 January 1928, together with some 20 others.

In 1938, she received the Prix d'Académie from the Académie Française for her life's work. She died on 15 October 1938, in Lyon, and is buried in Cap-d'Ail, on the French Riviera where she stayed  regularly and often wrote about.

Awards and honors
 Knight, Legion of Honour, 27 February 1927
 Prix d'Académie, Académie Française, 1938

Selected works 

 Les Sévriennes, 1900
 Un lycée de jeunes filles, 1901
 Lycéennes, 1902
 La Cruche Cassée, 1904
 La Bachelière, 1910
 L'Avenir de nos filles, 1904
 L'Infante à la rose, 1920
 La fontaine des amours, 1923
 La Tour du feu, 1928
 La Côte d'Azur, 1934

References

External links
 

1869 births
1938 deaths
20th-century French novelists
20th-century French women writers
20th-century pseudonymous writers
Writers from Lyon
French essayists
Chevaliers of the Légion d'honneur
French women novelists
French women essayists
People from Viterbo
Pseudonymous women writers